The Turvo River is a river of São Paulo state in southeastern Brazil. It joins the Pardo River shortly before that in turn joins the Paranapanema River near the city of Ourinhos.

See also
List of rivers of São Paulo

References
Brazilian Ministry of Transport

Rivers of São Paulo (state)